General elections were held in the British Virgin Islands on 28 November 1963 for seats on the Legislative Council of the British Virgin Islands.

For the general election the Territory was divided into five districts, the largest of which (the 2nd District - Road Town) would have two members.  All seats were contested.

The Supervisor of Elections was Ralph T. O'Neal.

Results
At the time candidates were not affiliated with political parties.  Notable candidates elected for the first time included future Leader of the Opposition, Q.W. Osborne, and future Minister, Terrance B. Lettsome.

The 1963 election essentially served as a prelude to the introduction of Ministerial government in the next election in 1967.  The three most prominent politicians elected, Lavity Stoutt, Q.W. Osborne and Ivan Dawson went on to form political parties in 1967 to contest the election once party politics was introduced to the jurisdiction.

Appointments
Prior to 1967 there were no Ministerial appointments in the British Virgin Islands, but elected politicians did undertake certain Ministerial type responsibilities.  Subsequent to the election, Lavity Stoutt was appointed Member for Communications and Works, and Ivan Dawson was appointed Member for Trade and Production.

References

Elections in the British Virgin Islands
British Virgin
General election
November 1963 events in North America
British Virgin
Election and referendum articles with incomplete results